The 2016–17 Men's FIH Hockey World League was the third edition of the men's field hockey national team league series and last season of the World League. The tournament started in April 2016 in Singapore and finished in December 2017 in Bhubaneswar, India.

The Semifinals of this competition will also serve as a qualifier for the 2018 Men's Hockey World Cup as the 10/11 highest placed teams apart from the host nation and the five continental champions qualify.

Australia won the tournament's Final round for a record second time after defeating Argentina 2–1 in the final match. India won the third place match by defeating Germany 2–1.

From 2019 onwards, the tournament was replaced by Pro League.

Qualification
Each national association member of the International Hockey Federation (FIH) had the opportunity to compete in the tournament, and after seeking entries to participate, several teams were announced to compete.

The 11 teams ranked between 1st and 11th in the FIH World Rankings current at early 2015 received an automatic bye to the Semifinals while the 9 teams ranked between 12th and 20th received an automatic bye to Round 2. Those twenty teams, shown with qualifying rankings, were the following:

 (1)
 (2)
 (3)
 (4)
 (5)
 (6)
 (7)
 (8)
 (9)
 (10)
 (11)

 (12)
 (13)
 (14)
 (15)
 (16)
 (17)
 (18)
 (19)
 (20)

Schedule

Round 1

Round 2

Semifinals

Final

Final ranking
FIH issued a final ranking to determine the world ranking. The final ranking was as follows:

References

Men's FIH Hockey World League
FIH Hockey World League
FIH Hockey World League